The 2006–07 Munster Rugby season was Munster's sixth season competing in the Celtic League, alongside which they also competed in the Heineken Cup. It was Declan Kidney's second season as head coach, in his second spell at the province.

2006–07 squad

Pre-season

2006–07 Celtic League

2006–07 Heineken Cup

Pool 4

Notes:
Leicester Tigers win the pool on the second tiebreaker of head-to-head tries, 3–2.

Quarter-final

References

External links
2006–07 Munster Rugby season official site 

2006–07
2006–07 Celtic League by team
2006–07 in Irish rugby union
2006–07 Heineken Cup by team